Minuscule 685 (in the Gregory-Aland numbering) ε 339 (von Soden), is a Greek minuscule manuscript of the New Testament on a parchment. It is dated palaeographically to the 13th century. Scrivener labelled it by 1147e. It contains marginalia.

Description 

The codex contains the text of the four Gospels, on 229 parchment leaves (24.2 cm by 16 cm). The leaves are not foliated. The text is written in one column per page, 24 lines per page in minuscule letters.

It contains prolegomena to the four Gospels, the tables of the  before each Gospel, lectionary markings at the margin for liturgical use, incipits,  (lessons), Synaxarion (liturgical book with hagiographies), subscriptions at the end of each of the Gospels, and numbers of stichoi to the Gospel of John.

The Pericope Adulterae (John 7:53-8:11) is marked by an obelus.

Text 

The Greek text of the codex is a representative of the Byzantine text-type. Hermann von Soden classified it as a member of the textual family Kr. Aland placed it in Category V.

According to the Claremont Profile Method it represents family Kr in Luke 1, Luke 10, and Luke 20.

History 

Formerly the manuscript was held in London (Huth 354).

It was added to the list of the New Testament manuscripts by Scrivener (1147e) and Gregory (658e).

Actually the codex is housed at the University of Michigan (Ms. 151), in Ann Arbor.

See also 

 List of New Testament minuscules
 Textual criticism
 Biblical manuscript

References

Further reading 
 D. O. Voss, Kr Variants in Mk, in S. Lake, Family Π and the Codex Alexandrinus, S & D V (London, 1936), pp. 155–158

External links 

 Images of Minuscule 685 at the CSNTM

Greek New Testament minuscules
13th-century biblical manuscripts